Francesco Bruni (born 30 September 1961) is an Italian screenwriter and director.

Life and career 
Born in Rome, Bruni started his professional career as a screenwriter in 1991, for the film Condominio. In 1994 he started a long collaboration with director Paolo Virzì with Virzì's debut film La bella vita.

In 2011 Bruni made his directorial debut with Easy!, which got him the David di Donatello for Best New Director as well as the Silver Ribbon in the same category.

Bruni teaches screenwriting at the Centro Sperimentale di Cinematografia in Rome. He is the father of rapper and singer Side Baby.

Selected filmography 

  La bella vita (1994) 
 August Vacation  (1995) 
 The Second Time (1995) 
 Ovosodo (1997) 
  Notes of Love (1998) 
 Kisses and Hugs (1999) 
 I Prefer the Sound of the Sea (2000) 
 The Words of My Father (2001) 
 My Name Is Tanino  (2002) 
 Nati stanchi  (2002) 
 Happiness Costs Nothing (2003) 
 Caterina in the Big City  (2003) 
 Napoleon and Me (2006) 
 Il 7 e l'8 (2007) 
 I Vicerè (2007) 
 Your Whole Life Ahead of You (2008) 
 La matassa (2009) 
 The First Beautiful Thing (2010) 
 Marriage and Other Disasters (2010) 
 It May Be Love But It Doesn't Show (2011) 
 Easy! (2011, also director)
 Every Blessed Day (2012) 
 Human Capital (2013) 
 Studio illegale (2013) 
 Noi 4 (2014, also director)

References

External links 
  

1961 births
Living people
Italian film directors
Italian screenwriters
Film people from Rome
David di Donatello winners
Nastro d'Argento winners
Ciak d'oro winners
Italian male screenwriters